The Chieftains 9: Boil the Breakfast Early is an Irish folk album by The Chieftains. This album featured a big change in The Chieftains sound, because two of the founding members, Seán Potts and Michael Tubridy, had left the group. The replacement for Tubridy was Matt Molloy, who had just been a member for both The Bothy Band and Planxty.

This album also featured a song where Kevin Conneff for the first time sings a cappella. Jolyon Jackson also played cello on three tracks.

Track listing
"Boil the Breakfast Early" – 3:51
"Boil the Breakfast Early" (reel)
"Scotch Mary" (reel)
"The Chicago Reel" (reel)
"Mrs. Judge" (composed by Turlough O'Carolan) – 3:59
"March From Oscar And Malvina" – 4:11
"When A Man's In Love" (Kevin Conneff vocal solo) – 3:35
"Bealach An Doirín" – 3:41
"The Home Ruler" (hornpipe)
"Terry 'Cuz' Teahan's Favourite" (slide)
"Charlie's Buttermilk Mary" (reel)
"Ag Taisteal Na Blárnan (Travelling Through Blarney)" – 3:19
"Carolan's Welcome" (composed by Turlough O'Carolan) – 2:51
"Up Against the Buachalawns" – 4:00
"Larry Redican's Reel" (reel)
"Up Against the Buachalawns" (reel)
"Johnny Maguires Reel" (reel)
"Sweeney's Dream" (reel)
"Gol Na Mban San Ár" – 4:16
"Gol Na Mban San Ár (The Crying of the Women at the Slaughter)" (air)
"Seán Ó 'Duibhir a'Ghleanna (John O'Dwyer of the Glen" (set dance)
"Chase Around the Windmill" (medley) – 5:02
"Toss The Feathers" (reel)
"Ballinasloe Fair" (jig)
"Caílleach An Airgid (The Hag with the Money)" (jig)
"Cúil Aodha Slide" (slide)
"The Pretty Girl" (slide)

Personnel
Paddy Moloney – Uilleann pipes, tin whistle
Seán Keane – fiddle
Martin Fay – fiddle, bones
Derek Bell – neo Irish harp, medieval harps, tiompán
Kevin Conneff – bodhrán, vocal
Matt Molloy – flute, tin whistle
Jolyon Jackson – cello (tracks 1, 8 and 10)

References

External links
 

The Chieftains albums
1979 albums
Claddagh Records albums